Johann Georg Haag-Rutenberg  (10 October 1830 Frankfurt am Main – 20 November 1879 Frankfurt am Main) was a German entomologist, lawyer and farmer, who was also an authority on the Coleoptera. His acronym is Haag.

His Coleoptera collections are kept at the following places - 
Melolonthidae 1878 via G. Metzler 1880 at Dt. Ent. Inst. Berlin 
Tenebrionidae and various Heteromera ex parte 1880 via Clemens Müller 1903 at Zool. Staatsslg. München
Erotylidae and Languridae 1880 via E. Fleutiaux at Neervoort van de Poll 
Coccinellidae, Chrysomelidae, Cetoniidae and duplicate Heteromera 1880 via G. Kraatz 1909 at Dt. Ent. Inst. Berlin
Buprestidae 1880 at F. Baden, 1934 via A. Théry at Mus. Nation. Hist. Nat. Paris 
Meloidae 1880 at Mus. Hist. Nat. Belg. Brüssel 
Cerambycidae at Witte/Breslau 
Tenebrionidae ex parte at Mus. civ. St. nat. Genova

Citations
Anonymous 1879: [Haag-Ruthenberg, J. G.] Le Naturaliste Canadien, Quebec 1, p. 148
Anonymous 1880: [Biogrphien] Zoologischer Anzeiger, Leipzig 3 
Dohrn, C. A. 1880: [Haag-Ruthenberg, J. G.] Stett. ent. Ztg., Stettin 41, p. 111-113
Fitch, E. A. 1880: [Biographien] The Entomologist, London 13 
Harold, von 1880: [Haag-Ruthenberg, J. G.] Mitt. Münchn. ent. Ver. 4, p. 173-175
Kraatz, G. 1880: [Haag-Ruthenberg, J. G.] Deutsche entomologische Zeitschrift, Beiheft 24, p. 231-235
Marseul, S. A. de 1880: [Haag-Ruthenberg, J. G.] L'Abeille, Nouvelles et faits divers, Deuxieme série, Paris (No. 31), p. 122-123
Marseul, S. A. de] 1882: Les Entomologistes et leurs Écrits. L'Abeille. Journal d'entomologie. Quatrieme. série. Par. M. S.-A. de Marseul, Paris 20(=2), p. 1-60
Marwinski, F. 1974 Beiträge zur Entomologie, Berlin 24, p. 372-373 
Musgrave, A. B. 1932: [Haag-Ruthenberg, J. G.] Bib. austr. Ent, p. 137
Poggi, R.; Conci, C. 1996: [Haag-Rutenberg, G. J.] Memorie della Società Entomologica Italiana, Genova 75
Scherer, G. 1992: Die Sektion Coleoptera der Zoologischen Staatssammlung München. Spixiana. Zeitschrift für Zoologie, Supplement, München 17, p. 61-71

References

1830 births
1879 deaths
German entomologists
Coleopterists